Acer wangchii is an uncommon Asian species of maple. It has been found only in southwestern China (Guangxi, Guizhou).

Acer wangchii is an evergreen tree up to 15 meters tall with rough brown or purple bark. Leaves are non-compound, up to 11 cm wide and  cm across, thick and leathery, lance-shaped with no lobes. Fruits are purple, this being unusual in the genus.

References

External links
line drawing for Flora of China figure 1 at bottom

wangchii
Plants described in 1966
Flora of Guizhou
Flora of Guangxi